Green Township is the name of eight townships in the U.S. state of Indiana:

 Green Township, Grant County, Indiana
 Green Township, Hancock County, Indiana
 Green Township, Madison County, Indiana
 Green Township, Marshall County, Indiana
 Green Township, Morgan County, Indiana
 Green Township, Noble County, Indiana
 Green Township, Randolph County, Indiana
 Green Township, Wayne County, Indiana

See also:
 Greene Township, Indiana (disambiguation)
 Green Township (disambiguation)

Indiana township disambiguation pages